Dimitrios Diamantakos (born 5 March 1993) is a Greek professional footballer who plays as a forward for Indian Super League club Kerala Blasters.

Club career

Olympiacos
Diamantakos started his career at Atromitos Piraeus, from which he moved to the youth teams of Olympiacos in 2009.

Loan spells
In 2012, he moved to Super League side Panionios on loan. In January 2013 he joined Aris on loan. He made 13 appearances without scoring any goal.
In June 2013 he joined Ergotelis on loan. He had his best season so far by scoring 10 goals in 27 appearances in the league and in the cup.

Return to Olympiacos
Following his loan spell at Ergotelis, Olympiacos decided to keep him for the 2014–15 season. Diamantakos made his debut on 23 August 2014 with Olympiacos in the Superleague on a home game against Niki Volos and managed to score his first goal in the 28th minute with a close range strike. In February 2015, according to Russian reports, Arsenal Tula was close to signing Dimitris Diamantakos. With the Russian transfer window still open the striker reportedly was in the club's shortlist.

Overall, he had little playing time in his first season with Olympiacos, having to settle for a role mainly on the bench. He scored 4 goals in 17 appearances across all competitions helping his club on its route to winning the Greek Cup.

Loan to Karlsruher SC
In August 2015, Diamantakos joined Karlsruher SC for the season, again on loan. On 6 November 2015, in his fourth appearance he scored his first goal for the club scoring in a 3–0 home win against VfL Bochum. On 12 December 2015, he scored his third goal in the league, helping his club return to winning ways against SpVgg Greuther Fürth. On 18 December 2015, Diamantakos scored for the third time in a row, sealing Karlsruhe's win away to FC St. Pauli.

Karlsruher SC
On 18 February 2016, Karlsruhe completed the permanent signing of the Greek striker for a reported transfer fee of €1 million. The transfer took immediate effect as the loan contract with Olympiacos was cancelled.
On 20 February 2016, he scored the second goal helping his club to escape with a 2–2 home draw against Eintracht Braunschweig after teammate Ylli Sallahi had been sent off. On 3 April 2016, he scored in a 3–1 home win game against 1860 Munich. On 2 May 2016, Diamantakos scored twice as Karlsruher SC beat neighbours SV Sandhausen 3–0 to record a third successive home win.

Diamantakos scored his first goal of the 2016–17 season on the second matchday, in a 1–1 draw against VfL Bochum. On 18 September 2016, he scored the equalising goal in a 1–1 draw against FC St. Pauli. On 19 November 2016, he scored the leading goal for Karlsruhe, as they dominated in the first half of the game, but lacked the force and determination in the attack, facing an unexpected 1–3 loss from SV Sandhausen. On 2 December 2016, was the fateful player as he scored to a penalty kick reducing the score, and missed the decisive penalty and the chance to tie up the game in a 2–1 home loss against Greuther Fürth. On 4 March 2017, he scored with a penalty kick sealing a 2–0 win home for his club against Hannover 96 in his club effort to avoid relegation.

VfL Bochum
On 10 June 2017, after the relegation of Karlsruhe, Bochum announced signing Diamantakos for the 2017–18 season.

FC St. Pauli
On 25 January 2018, it was announced Diamantakos would sign with another 2. Bundesliga club FC St. Pauli on a -year contract until summer 2020, re-joining his former coach at Karlsruhe, Markus Kauczinski. He had been unable to secure a regular spot in the first-team lineup at Bochum. On 28 April 2018, he scored his first goal with the club in a 3–0 home win game against Greuther Fürth in his club's effort to avoid relegation.
He started the 2018–19 season as a starter, in his club effort to be promoted to Bundesliga, but gradually lost his place in the starting XI, playing only few minutes as a late substitute. On 22 December 2018, he scored a brace as a substitute in a 4–1 home win game against 1. FC Magdeburg.
On 27 April 2019, he scored in a 4–3 home win game against Jahn Regensburg.
On 19 May 2019, he scored in a 2–1 away loss against Greuther Fürth after an assist from Finn Ole Becker. On 2 August 2019, he scored his first goal for the 2019–20 season in a 3–1 home loss against Greuther Fürth. On 31 August 2019, he scored a brace in the first half, in a 3–3 away draw against Dynamo Dresden. On 16 September 2019, he scored with a header after a cross from Mats Møller Dæhli and Marvin Knoll's failure to score as the ball hit the left post, and the Greek international got the rebound in a 2–0 home win game against Hamburger SV. On 2 November 2019, Diamantakos scored with two penalty kicks giving a two goals-lead in a frustrated 2–2 home draw game against Karlsruher SC. On 20 November 2019, he suffered a torn muscle fibre and will return to action after a period of two months. On 1 March 2020, he netted with a crisp drive after an assist from Marvin Knoll in a 3–2 home win game against VfL Osnabrück. A week later, he cutting inside before smacking a shot into the roof of the net, scoring a late goal after Borys Tashchy sealing a 2–2 away draw game against SV Sandhausen. On 30 May 2020, Diamantakos scored with a left footed shot from outside the box to the bottom right corner after Bjarne Thoelke's assist in a 1–1 away draw against his ex-club Karlsruher SC. On 21 June 2020, Diamantakos used a jumble in the SSV Jahn Regensburg's defense to score his eleventh goal of the season, in a final 1–1 draw.

Hajduk Split
On 6 July 2020, free agent Diamantakos signed a three-year contract with Croatian club Hajduk Split.

Loan to Ashdod
On 6 January 2022, Diamantakos moved to Israeli side Ashdod on loan until summer 2022.

Kerala Blasters
On 25 August 2022, Diamantakos completed a move to the Indian Super League club Kerala Blasters after terminating contract with his former club Hajduk Split. His Indian Super League debut with the Blasters came on 7 October 2022 in a 3–1 win against East Bengal on the opening day of the 2022–23 season. On 5 November, he scored his debut goal for the Blasters in a 3–0 win against NorthEast United FC in the 56th minute. Diamantakos' next goal came in their next match versus FC Goa on 13 November, where he netted a penalty in the closing moments of the first-half as the Blasters won 3–1 against the Goan side. His goalscoring-spree continued as Diamantakos netted his third and fourth goal in the next two matches against Hyderabad FC and Jamshedpur FC on 19 November and 4 December respectively, where he scored the only goals for the Blasters as they won both the games 0–1 away from home. On 11 December, he scored his fifth consecutive goal of the season in a 3–2 win against the southern rivals Bengaluru FC and became the first ever player to score in five consecutive matches for the Blasters. He also assisted for Apostolos Giannou's goal in the 70th minute and won the Hero of the Match Award. His seventh goal for the Blasters came in the returning fixture against FC Goa on 22 January 2023, where he scored the only goal for the latter in the 51st minute but the Blasters lost the match 3–1 at full-time. On 18 February, Diamantakos became the second player in the Blasters' history to score ten goals, when he scored in the Blasters 2–1 defeat against ATK Mohun Bagan FC.

International career
Diamantakos was a member of the Greek under-19 squad that earned second place in the 2012 UEFA European Under-19 Championship. He made his international debut for Greece on 7 September 2014 against Romania.

Career statistics

Club

Honours
Olympiacos
Super League Greece: 2014–15

Greece U19
UEFA European Under-19 Championship runner-up: 2012

References

External links
 Profile at Olympiacos.org 
 Profile at Onsports.gr 

1993 births
Living people
Footballers from Piraeus
Association football forwards
Greece international footballers
Greece youth international footballers
Greece under-21 international footballers
Super League Greece players
2. Bundesliga players
Olympiacos F.C. players
Aris Thessaloniki F.C. players
Panionios F.C. players
Ergotelis F.C. players
Karlsruher SC players
VfL Bochum players
FC St. Pauli players
HNK Hajduk Split players
F.C. Ashdod players
Croatian Football League players
Greek expatriate footballers
Expatriate footballers in Germany
Expatriate footballers in Croatia
Expatriate footballers in Israel
Greek expatriate sportspeople in Croatia
Greek expatriate sportspeople in Germany
Greek expatriate sportspeople in Israel
Greek footballers
Indian Super League players
Kerala Blasters FC players